D.W. Heagy Farm, also known as Pine Grove Farm, is a historic home and farm located at Columbus Township, Bartholomew County, Indiana. The house was built in 1879, and is a two-story, Italianate style cross-plan brick dwelling with an attached summer kitchen. It has a hipped roof and sits on a fieldstone foundation. Also on the property are the contributing milk house, small shed, wagon shed, frame German bank barn (1912), silo, pump, and trough (1930).

It was listed on the National Register of Historic Places in 1998.

References

Farms on the National Register of Historic Places in Indiana
Italianate architecture in Indiana
Houses completed in 1879
Buildings and structures in Bartholomew County, Indiana
National Register of Historic Places in Bartholomew County, Indiana